The variable fat-tailed gecko or burrow-plug gecko (Diplodactylus conspicillatus) is a diplodactylid gecko endemic to central and arid inland areas of Australia. Widespread across the continent, the variable fat-tailed is most commonly found in sandy desert habitats dominated by Spinifex grasses. They have also been bred in captivity by zoos and as pets.

Description 

The variable fat-tailed gecko is small-medium-sized gecko with a pale fawn to reddish-brown body. It has a dark brown reticulated pattern over the dorsal aspect of its body and pale to white speckles covering the body. Limbs, lips and underside of the geckos are paler than the rest of the body and a dark streak presents between the snout and eye, sometimes continuing beyond the eye.

Variable fat-tailed geckos have a stout body, short limbs and a broad, flat tail of similar size to the head. They are approximately 60mm long, snout-to-vent (SVL = measurement taken from the tip of an animal's nose to the opening of the cloaca) with a tail around 40% of the SVL (approximately 24mm).
 
The dorsal scales are large and homogenous, continuing into plate-like scales over the tail. Nostrils are separated from the rostral scale by an anterior nasal scale and the mental scale is hemispherical in shape. They have a large primary supralabial scale followed by small, granular supralabials no larger than the adjacent loreals.

Like most gecko species, the variable fat-tailed gecko lacks a moveable eyelid and instead relies on a long, flexible tongue to keep their eyes moist and clean.

Both male and female geckos possess paracloacal (parallel to the cloaca) spurs, small clusters of around 3-8 spines. It is important to note that although present in both sexes, paracloacal spurs in females are rarely more than 50% larger than adjacent body scales. In addition to paracloacal spurs, a key identifying feature of the variable fat-tailed gecko is a lack of pre-anal pores.

Taxonomy 

Diplodactylus conspicillatus was first identified in 1897 by Arthur Henry Lucas and Charles Frost.

The genus Diplodactylus consists of 27 gecko species commonly referred to as stone or fat-tailed geckos. Species within the genus are morphologically similar but genetically distinct.<ref name=Doughty>{{cite journal |last1=Doughty |first1=Paul |last2=Oliver |first2=Paul |title=Systematics of Diplodactylus (Squamata:Diplodactylidae) from the south-western Australian biodiversity hotspot: redefinition of D. polyophthalmus and the description of two new species |journal=Records of the Western Australian Museum |date=2013 |volume=28 |pages=44–65 |doi=10.18195/issn.0312-3162.28(1).2013.044-065 |url=http://museum.wa.gov.au/sites/default/files/RecWAMuseum_2013_28(1)_44to65_DOUGHTYetal_0.pdf |accessdate=May 24, 2019}}</ref> For example, Diplodactylus kenneallyi, Diplodactylus savage, Diplodactylus pulcher and Diplodactylus conspicillatus all share similar morphological traits. As a result, many Diplodactylus species have been reclassified and redescribed over the years to more accurately represent the diversity within the genus.

 Distribution and Habitat Diplodactylus conspicillatus is widely distributed across mainland Australia within arid and semi-arid habitats. They range from inland New South Wales, Queensland and South Australia to northern regions of Western Australia and the Northern Territory. They are also found in coastal regions of north-western Western Australia and north-eastern Northern Territory.

These terrestrial geckos inhabit a variety of ecosystems including sandy deserts, open grasslands, shrublands, rocky outcrops and stony ranges, although are most commonly found in sandy deserts dominated by Spinifex grasses. They are often found sheltering in fallen trees, cracks in the soil, among rocks and in abandoned lizard/spider burrows.

 Ecology 

Variable fat-tailed geckos are nocturnal (active during the night) and like most lizards are ectothermic, absorbing warmth and energy from the sun during the day, so they can then hunt and digest their food at night. As a nocturnal species, the variable fat-tailed gecko seeks out warm places to shelter in during the day such as rocks, fallen trees and abandoned burrows or spiders and other lizards. Shelter-seeking behaviour is observed in many desert dwelling species to provide protection of diurnal (active during the day) predators and prevent body temperatures from exceeding the preferred body temperature (PBT).

Endemic to remote areas of Australia, there is little known about the behaviours and ecology of the variable fat-tailed gecko. This dilemma is also contributed to by the difficulties often faced identifying this species correctly due to similarities with other Diplodactylids. Further research into breeding, hunting and adaptive behaviours as well as the ecophysiology of this species is needed.

 Diet 

Variable fat-tailed geckos are specialist feeders, feeding almost exclusively on termites. In addition to termites, these insectivores will also eat crickets, spiders, ants and other small insects.

Water sources in many arid zones of Australia are scarce and so, variable fat-tailed geckos most likely obtain water from morning dew and other water residues.

 Reproduction Diplodactylus conspicillatus'' are oviparous meaning they lay eggs as opposed to giving birth to live young. They breed from September to February and November to March in more northern areas. Little is known about their mating behaviour; however, it is thought cloacal spurs are most likely used to grasp the female during copulation.

Gravid females exhibit a marked increase in girth before laying their eggs in shallow scapes of moist sand or on the sand surface beneath fallen trees and other vegetation. Typical clutch size is 1-2 eggs, with females laying multiple clutches per season. Eggs are 15.5 x 9.25 mm (length x width) in size and reach full incubation around 59–65 days. The average hatchling size is 24–27 mm (SVL).

In captivity, the variable fat-tailed gecko has been observed to reach sexual maturity at 70-80% of adult SVL around 12–18 months of age.

Predators and Threats 

Natural predators of the variable fat-tailed gecko include birds of prey, snakes and other lizards. Many of these predators are avoided during the day by seeking shelter.

The variable fat-tailed gecko is currently listed on the IUCN Red List as of least concern. However, although not currently threatened like many Australian species they are still susceptible to increasing environmental threats such as habitat degradation, habitat loss, climate change and predation by feral species such as cats, dogs and foxes.

References

Diplodactylus
Reptiles described in 1897
Taxa named by Arthur Henry Shakespeare Lucas
Taxa named by Charles Frost (naturalist)
Geckos of Australia